Brunswick Estate may refer to:
Brunswick (Hove), Sussex
Brunswick, West Midlands (Wednesbury)